The history of ancient Israel and Judah begins in the Southern Levant region of Western Asia during the Late Bronze Age and Early Iron Age. "Israel" as a people or tribal confederation (see Israelites) appears for the first time in the Merneptah Stele, an inscription from ancient Egypt that dates to about 1208 BCE. According to modern archaeology, ancient Israelite culture developed as an outgrowth from the Semitic Canaanites. Two related Israelite polities known as the Kingdom of Israel (Samaria) and the Kingdom of Judah had emerged in the region by Iron Age II.

According to the Hebrew Bible, a "United Monarchy" (consisting of Israel and Judah) existed as early as the 11th century BCE, under the reigns of Saul, David, and Solomon; the country later would have split into two separate kingdoms: Israel, containing the cities of Shechem and Samaria in the north, and Judah (containing Jerusalem and the Jewish Temple) in the south.

Archaeological remains during that time does however, include Shoshenq I of the 22nd Dynasty of Egypt invading the Levant around 930-925 BCE, conquering many cities and settlements. Unlike the United Monarchy, archaeological evidence of the conquest have been found in various sites in the Levant. However, the 22nd Dynasty did not directly annex the Levant following the conquest and brought the Levant back into Egyptian domination for unknown reasons. It was theorized by Israel Finkelstein that Shoshenq I invaded the Levant in order to prevent the formation of a unified state under the Israelites, thus forming the basis of the biblical story of Jeroboam's Revolt.

The Kingdom of Israel was destroyed around 720 BCE, when it was conquered by the Neo-Assyrian Empire. While the Kingdom of Judah remained intact during this time, it became a client state of first the Neo-Assyrian Empire and then the Neo-Babylonian Empire. However, Jewish revolts against the Babylonians led to the destruction of Judah in 586 BCE, under the rule of Babylonian king Nebuchadnezzar II. According to the biblical account, the armies of Nebuchadnezzar II besieged Jerusalem between 589–586 BCE, which led to the destruction of Solomon's Temple and the exile of the Jews to Babylon; this event was also recorded in the Babylonian Chronicles. The exilic period, which saw the development of the Israelite religion (Yahwism) towards the distinct monotheism of Judaism, ended with the fall of Babylon to the Achaemenid Persian Empire around 538 BCE. Subsequently, Persian king Cyrus the Great issued a proclamation known as the Edict of Cyrus, which authorized and encouraged exiled Jews to return to the Land of Israel. Cyrus' proclamation began the exiles' return to Zion, inaugurating the formative period in which a more distinctive Jewish identity was developed in the Persian province of Yehud. During this time, the destroyed Solomon's Temple was replaced by the Second Temple, marking the beginning of the Second Temple period.

During the Hellenistic period, Yehud was absorbed into the Hellenistic kingdoms that followed the conquests of Alexander the Great. The 2nd century BCE saw a successful Jewish revolt against the Seleucid Empire and the subsequent formation of the Hasmonean kingdom—the last nominally independent kingdom of Israel. The Hasmonean kingdom gradually began to lose its independence from 63 BCE onwards, under Pompey the Great. It eventually became a client state of the Roman Republic and later of the Parthian Empire. Following the installation of client kingdoms under the Herodian dynasty, the Roman province of Judaea was wracked by civil disturbances, which culminated in the First Jewish–Roman War. The Jewish defeat by the Roman Empire in this conflict saw the destruction of the Second Temple in 70 CE as well as the emergence of Rabbinic Judaism and early Christianity. The name Judaea then ceased to be used by the Greco-Romans. After the Bar Kokhba revolt of 135 CE, the majority of Jews in the Levant were expelled, after which Judaea was renamed by the Romans to Syria Palaestina.

Periods
 Iron Age I: 1150 –950 BCE
 Iron Age II: 950–586 BCE
 Neo-Babylonian: 586–539 BCE
 Persian: 539–332 BCE
 Hellenistic: 333–53 BCE

Other academic terms often used are:
 First Temple period / Israelite period (c. 1000–586 BCE)
 Second Temple period (c. 516 BCE–70 CE)

Late Bronze Age background (1550–1150 BCE)
The eastern Mediterranean seaboard the Levant stretches 400 miles north to south from the Taurus Mountains to the Sinai Peninsula, and 70 to 100 miles east to west between the sea and the Arabian Desert. The coastal plain of the southern Levant, broad in the south and narrowing to the north, is backed in its southernmost portion by a zone of foothills, the Shfela; like the plain this narrows as it goes northwards, ending in the promontory of Mount Carmel. East of the plain and the Shfela is a mountainous ridge, the "hill country of Judea" in the south, the "hill country of Ephraim" north of that, then Galilee and Mount Lebanon. To the east again lie the steep-sided valley occupied by the Jordan River, the Dead Sea, and the wadi of the Arabah, which continues down to the eastern arm of the Red Sea. Beyond the plateau is the Syrian desert, separating the Levant from Mesopotamia. To the southwest is Egypt, to the northeast Mesopotamia. The location and geographical characteristics of the narrow Levant made the area a battleground among the powerful entities that surrounded it.

Canaan in the Late Bronze Age was a shadow of what it had been centuries earlier: many cities were abandoned, others shrank in size, and the total settled population was probably not much more than a hundred thousand. Settlement was concentrated in cities along the coastal plain and along major communication routes; the central and northern hill country which would later become the biblical kingdom of Israel was only sparsely inhabited although letters from the Egyptian archives indicate that Jerusalem was already a Canaanite city-state recognising Egyptian overlordship. Politically and culturally it was dominated by Egypt, each city under its own ruler, constantly at odds with its neighbours, and appealing to the Egyptians to adjudicate their differences.

The Canaanite city state system broke down during the Late Bronze Age collapse, and Canaanite culture was then gradually absorbed into those of the Philistines, Phoenicians and Israelites. The process was gradual and a strong Egyptian presence continued into the 12th century BCE, and, while some Canaanite cities were destroyed, others continued to exist in Iron Age I.

The name "Israel" first appears in the Merneptah Stele c. 1208 BCE: "Israel is laid waste and his seed is no more." This "Israel" was a cultural and probably political entity, well enough established for the Egyptians to perceive it as a possible challenge, but an ethnic group rather than an organised state.

Iron Age I (1150–950 BCE)
Archaeologist Paula McNutt says: "It is probably… during Iron Age I [that] a population began to identify itself as 'Israelite'," differentiating itself from its neighbours via prohibitions on intermarriage, an emphasis on family history and genealogy, and religion.

In the Late Bronze Age there were no more than about 25 villages in the highlands, but this increased to over 300 by the end of Iron Age I, while the settled population doubled from 20,000 to 40,000. The villages were more numerous and larger in the north, and probably shared the highlands with pastoral nomads, who left no remains. Archaeologists and historians attempting to trace the origins of these villagers have found it impossible to identify any distinctive features that could define them as specifically Israelite collared-rim jars and four-room houses have been identified outside the highlands and thus cannot be used to distinguish Israelite sites, and while the pottery of the highland villages is far more limited than that of lowland Canaanite sites, it develops typologically out of Canaanite pottery that came before. Israel Finkelstein proposed that the oval or circular layout that distinguishes some of the earliest highland sites, and the notable absence of pig bones from hill sites, could be taken as markers of ethnicity, but others have cautioned that these can be a "common-sense" adaptation to highland life and not necessarily revelatory of origins. Other Aramaean sites also demonstrate a contemporary absence of pig remains at that time, unlike earlier Canaanite and later Philistine excavations.

In The Bible Unearthed (2001), Finkelstein and Silberman summarised recent studies. They described how, up until 1967, the Israelite heartland in the highlands of western Palestine was virtually an archaeological terra incognita. Since then, intensive surveys have examined the traditional territories of the tribes of Judah, Benjamin, Ephraim, and Manasseh. These surveys have revealed the sudden emergence of a new culture contrasting with the Philistine and Canaanite societies existing in the Land of Israel earlier during Iron Age I. This new culture is characterised by a lack of pork remains (whereas pork formed 20% of the Philistine diet in places), by an abandonment of the Philistine/Canaanite custom of having highly decorated pottery, and by the practice of circumcision. The Israelite ethnic identity had originated, not from the Exodus and a subsequent conquest, but from a transformation of the existing Canaanite-Philistine cultures.

Modern scholars therefore see Israel arising peacefully and internally from existing people in the highlands of Canaan.

Extensive archaeological excavations have provided a picture of Israelite society during the early Iron Age period. The archaeological evidence indicates a society of village-like centres, but with more limited resources and a small population. During this period, Israelites lived primarily in small villages, the largest of which had populations of up to 300 or 400. Their villages were built on hilltops. Their houses were built in clusters around a common courtyard. They built three- or four-room houses out of mudbrick with a stone foundation and sometimes with a second story made of wood. The inhabitants lived by farming and herding. They built terraces to farm on hillsides, planting various crops and maintaining orchards. The villages were largely economically self-sufficient and economic interchange was prevalent. According to the Bible, prior to the rise of the Israelite monarchy the early Israelites were led by the Biblical judges, or chieftains who served as military leaders in times of crisis. Scholars are divided over the historicity of this account. However, it is likely that regional chiefdoms and polities provided security. The small villages were unwalled but were likely subjects of the major town in the area. Writing was known and available for recording, even at small sites.

Iron Age II (950–587 BCE)

According to Israel Finkelstein, after an emergent and large polity was suddenly formed based on the Gibeon-Gibeah plateau and destroyed by Shoshenq I, the biblical Shishak, in the 10th century BCE, a return to small city-states was prevalent in the Southern Levant, but between 950 and 900 BCE another large polity emerged in the northern highlands with its capital eventually at Tirzah, that can be considered the precursor of the Kingdom of Israel. The Kingdom of Israel was consolidated as an important regional power by the first half of the 9th century BCE, before falling to the Neo-Assyrian Empire in 722 BCE, and the Kingdom of Judah began to flourish in the second half of the 9th century BCE. 

Unusually favourable climatic conditions in the first two centuries of Iron Age II brought about an expansion of population, settlements and trade throughout the region. In the central highlands this resulted in unification in a kingdom with the city of Samaria as its capital, possibly by the second half of the 10th century BCE when an inscription of the Egyptian pharaoh Shoshenq I records a series of campaigns directed at the area. Israel had clearly emerged in the first half of the 9th century BCE, this is attested when the Assyrian king Shalmaneser III names "Ahab the Israelite" among his enemies at the battle of Qarqar (853 BCE). At this time Israel was apparently engaged in a three-way contest with Damascus and Tyre for control of the Jezreel Valley and Galilee in the north, and with Moab, Ammon and Aram Damascus in the east for control of Gilead; the Mesha Stele (c. 830 BCE), left by a king of Moab, celebrates his success in throwing off the oppression of the "House of Omri" (i.e., Israel). It bears what is generally thought to be the earliest extra-biblical reference to the name Yahweh. A century later Israel came into increasing conflict with the expanding Neo-Assyrian Empire, which first split its territory into several smaller units and then destroyed its capital, Samaria (722 BCE). Both the biblical and Assyrian sources speak of a massive deportation of people from Israel and their replacement with settlers from other parts of the empire such population exchanges were an established part of Assyrian imperial policy, a means of breaking the old power structure and the former Israel never again became an independent political entity.

Judah emerged as an operational kingdom somewhat later than Israel, during the second half of 9th century BCE, but the subject is one of considerable controversy. There are indications that during the 10th and 9th centuries BCE, the southern highlands had been divided between a number of centres, none with clear primacy. During the reign of Hezekiah, between c. 715 and 686 BCE, a notable increase in the power of the Judean state can be observed. This is reflected in archaeological sites and findings, such as the Broad Wall; a defensive city wall in Jerusalem; and the Siloam tunnel, an aqueduct designed to provide Jerusalem with water during an impending siege by the Neo-Assyrian Empire led by Sennacherib; and the Siloam inscription, a lintel inscription found over the doorway of a tomb, has been ascribed to comptroller Shebna. LMLK seals on storage jar handles, excavated from strata in and around that formed by Sennacherib's destruction, appear to have been used throughout Sennacherib's 29-year reign, along with bullae from sealed documents, some that belonged to Hezekiah himself and others that name his servants.

Archaeological records indicate that the Kingdom of Israel was fairly prosperous. The late Iron Age saw an increase in urban development in Israel. Whereas previously the Israelites had lived mainly in small and unfortified settlements, the rise of the Kingdom of Israel saw the growth of cities and the construction of palaces, large royal enclosures, and fortifications with walls and gates. Israel initially had to invest significant resources into defense as it was subjected to regular Aramean incursions and attacks, but after the Arameans were subjugated by the Assyrians and Israel could afford to put less resources into defending its territory, its architectural infrastructure grew dramatically. Extensive fortifications were built around cities such as Dan, Megiddo, and Hazor, including monumental and multi-towered city walls and multi-gate entry systems. Israel's economy was based on multiple industries. It had the largest olive oil production centers in the region, using at least two different types of olive oil presses, and also had a significant wine industry, with wine presses constructed next to vineyards. By contrast, the Kingdom of Judah was significantly less advanced. Some scholars believe it was no more than a small tribal entity limited to Jerusalem and its immediate surroundings. In the 10th and early 9th centuries BCE, the territory of Judah appears to have been sparsely populated, limited to small and mostly unfortified settlements. The status of Jerusalem in the 10th century BCE is a major subject of debate among scholars. Jerusalem does not show evidence of significant Israelite residential activity until the 9th century BCE. On the other hand, significant administrative structures such as the Stepped Stone Structure and Large Stone Structure, which originally formed part of one structure, contain material culture from earlier than that. The ruins of a significant Judahite military fortress, Tel Arad, have also been found in the Negev, and a collection of military orders found there suggest literacy was present throughout the ranks of the Judahite army. This suggests that literacy was not limited to a tiny elite, indicating the presence of a substantial educational infrastructure in Judah.In the 7th century Jerusalem grew to contain a population many times greater than earlier and achieved clear dominance over its neighbours. This occurred at the same time that Israel was being destroyed by the Neo-Assyrian Empire, and was probably the result of a cooperative arrangement with the Assyrians to establish Judah as an Assyrian vassal state controlling the valuable olive industry. Judah prospered as a vassal state (despite a disastrous rebellion against Sennacherib), but in the last half of the 7th century BCE, Assyria suddenly collapsed, and the ensuing competition between Egypt and the Neo-Babylonian Empire for control of the land led to the destruction of Judah in a series of campaigns between 597 and 582.

Babylonian period

Babylonian Judah suffered a steep decline in both economy and population and lost the Negev, the Shephelah, and part of the Judean hill country, including Hebron, to encroachments from Edom and other neighbours. Jerusalem, while probably not totally abandoned, was much smaller than previously, and the town of Mizpah in Benjamin in the relatively unscathed northern section of the kingdom became the capital of the new Babylonian province of Yehud Medinata. (This was standard Babylonian practice: when the Philistine city of Ashkalon was conquered in 604, the political, religious and economic elite [but not the bulk of the population] was banished and the administrative centre shifted to a new location). There is also a strong probability that for most or all of the period the temple at Bethel in Benjamin replaced that at Jerusalem, boosting the prestige of Bethel's priests (the Aaronites) against those of Jerusalem (the Zadokites), now in exile in Babylon.

The Babylonian conquest entailed not just the destruction of Jerusalem and its temple, but the liquidation of the entire infrastructure which had sustained Judah for centuries. The most significant casualty was the state ideology of "Zion theology," the idea that the god of Israel had chosen Jerusalem for his dwelling-place and that the Davidic dynasty would reign there forever. The fall of the city and the end of Davidic kingship forced the leaders of the exile community kings, priests, scribes and prophets to reformulate the concepts of community, faith and politics. The exile community in Babylon thus became the source of significant portions of the Hebrew Bible: Isaiah 40–55; Ezekiel; the final version of Jeremiah; the work of the hypothesized priestly source in the Pentateuch; and the final form of the history of Israel from Deuteronomy to 2 Kings. Theologically, the Babylonian exiles were responsible for the doctrines of individual responsibility and universalism (the concept that one god controls the entire world) and for the increased emphasis on purity and holiness. Most significantly, the trauma of the exile experience led to the development of a strong sense of Hebrew identity distinct from other peoples, with increased emphasis on symbols such as circumcision and Sabbath-observance to sustain that distinction.

Hans M. Barstad writes that the concentration of the biblical literature on the experience of the exiles in Babylon disguises that the great majority of the population remained in Judah; for them, life after the fall of Jerusalem probably went on much as it had before. It may even have improved, as they were rewarded with the land and property of the deportees, much to the anger of the community of exiles remaining in Babylon. Conversely, Avraham Faust's writes that archaeological and demographic surveys show that the population of Judah was significantly reduced to barely 10% of what it had been in the time before the Exile. The assassination around 582 of the Babylonian governor by a disaffected member of the former royal House of David provoked a Babylonian crackdown, possibly reflected in the Book of Lamentations, but the situation seems to have soon stabilised again. Nevertheless, those unwalled cities and towns that remained were subject to slave raids by the Phoenicians and intervention in their internal affairs by Samaritans, Arabs, and Ammonites.

Persian period

When Babylon fell to the founder and king of Achaemenid Empire, Cyrus the Great in 539 BCE, Judah (or Yehud medinata, the "province of Yehud") became an administrative division within the Achaemenid Empire. Cyrus was succeeded as king by Cambyses, who added Egypt to the empire, incidentally transforming Yehud and the Philistine plain into an important frontier zone. His death in 522 was followed by a period of turmoil until Darius the Great seized the throne in about 521. Darius introduced a reform of the administrative arrangements of the empire including the collection, codification and administration of local law codes, and it is reasonable to suppose that this policy lay behind the redaction of the Jewish Torah. After 404 the Persians lost control of Egypt, which became Persia's main rival outside Europe, causing the Persian authorities to tighten their administrative control over Yehud and the rest of the Levant. Egypt was eventually reconquered, but soon afterward Persia fell to Alexander the Great, ushering in the Hellenistic period in the Levant.

Yehud's population over the entire period was probably never more than about 30,000 and that of Jerusalem no more than about 1,500, most of them connected in some way to the Temple. According to the biblical history, one of the first acts of Cyrus, the Persian conqueror of Babylon, was to commission Jewish exiles to return to Jerusalem and rebuild their Temple, a task which they are said to have completed c. 515. Yet it was probably not until the middle of the next century, at the earliest, that Jerusalem again became the capital of Judah. The Persians may have experimented initially with ruling Yehud as a Davidic client-kingdom under descendants of Jehoiachin, but by the mid–5th century BCE, Yehud had become, in practice, a theocracy, ruled by hereditary high priests, with a Persian-appointed governor, frequently Jewish, charged with keeping order and seeing that taxes (tribute) were collected and paid. According to the biblical history, Ezra and Nehemiah arrived in Jerusalem in the middle of the 5th century BCE, the former empowered by the Persian king to enforce the Torah, the latter holding the status of governor with a royal commission to restore Jerusalem's walls. The biblical history mentions tension between the returnees and those who had remained in Yehud, the returnees rebuffing the attempt of the "peoples of the land" to participate in the rebuilding of the Temple; this attitude was based partly on the exclusivism that the exiles had developed while in Babylon and, probably, also partly on disputes over property. During the 5th century BCE, Ezra and Nehemiah attempted to re-integrate these rival factions into a united and ritually pure society, inspired by the prophecies of Ezekiel and his followers.

The Persian era, and especially the period between 538 and 400 BCE, laid the foundations for the unified Judaic religion and the beginning of a scriptural canon. Other important landmarks in this period include the replacement of Hebrew as the everyday language of Judah by Aramaic (although Hebrew continued to be used for religious and literary purposes) and Darius's reform of the empire's bureaucracy, which may have led to extensive revisions and reorganizations of the Jewish Torah. The Israel of the Persian period consisted of descendants of the inhabitants of the old kingdom of Judah, returnees from the Babylonian exile community, Mesopotamians who had joined them or had been exiled themselves to Samaria at a far earlier period, Samaritans, and others.

Hellenistic period

The beginning of the Hellenistic Period is marked by the conquest of Alexander the Great (333 BCE). When Alexander died in 323, he had no heirs that were able to take his place as ruler of his empire, so his generals divided the empire among themselves. Ptolemy I asserted himself as the ruler of Egypt in 322 and seized Yehud Medinata in 320, but his successors lost it in 198 to the Seleucids of Syria. At first, relations between Seleucids and Jews were cordial, but the attempt of Antiochus IV Epiphanes (174–163) to impose Hellenic cults on Judea sparked the Maccabean Revolt that ended in the expulsion of the Seleucids and the establishment of an independent Jewish kingdom under the Hasmonean dynasty. Some modern commentators see this period also as a civil war between orthodox and hellenized Jews. Hasmonean kings attempted to revive the Judah described in the Bible: a Jewish monarchy ruled from Jerusalem and including all territories once ruled by David and Solomon. In order to carry out this project, the Hasmoneans forcibly converted one-time Moabites, Edomites, and Ammonites to Judaism, as well as the lost kingdom of Israel. Some scholars argue that the Hasmonean dynasty institutionalized the final Jewish biblical canon.

Ptolemaic rule
Ptolemy I took control of Egypt in 322 BCE after the death of Alexander the Great. He also took control of Yehud Medinata in 320 because he was very aware that it was a great place from which to attack Egypt and was also a great defensive position. However, there were others who also had their eyes on that area. Another former general, Antigonus Monophthalmus, had driven out the satrap of Babylon, Seleucus, in 317 and continued on towards the Levant. Seleucus found refuge with Ptolemy and they both rallied troops against Antigonus' son Demetrius, since Antigonus had retreated back to Asia Minor. Demetrius was defeated at the battle of Gaza and Ptolemy regained control of Yehud Medinata. However, not soon after this Antigonus came back and forced Ptolemy to retreat back to Egypt. This went on until the Battle of Ipsus in 301 where Seleucus' armies defeated Antigonus. Seleucus was given the areas of Syria and Palestine, but Ptolemy would not give up those lands, causing the Syrian Wars between the Ptolemies and Seleucids. Not much is known about the happenings of those in Yehud Medinata from the time of Alexander's death until the Battle of Ipsus due to the frequent battles. At first, the Jews were content with Ptolemy's rule over them. His reign brought them peace and economic stability. He also allowed them to keep their religious practices, so long as they paid their taxes and didn't rebel. After Ptolemy I came Ptolemy II Philadelphus, who was able to keep the territory of Yehud Medinata and brought the dynasty to the peak of its power. He was victorious in both the first and second Syrian Wars, but after trying to end the conflict with the Seleucids by arranging a marriage between his daughter Berenice and the Seleucid king Antiochus II, he died. The arranged marriage did not work and Berenice, Antiochus, and their child were killed from an order of Antiochus' former wife. This was one of the reasons for the third Syrian War. Before all of this, Ptolemy II fought and defeated the Nabataeans. In order to enforce his hold on them, he reinforced many cities in Palestine and built new ones. As a result of this, more Greeks and Macedonians moved to those new cities and brought over their customs and culture, or Hellenism. The Ptolemaic Rule also gave rise to 'tax farmers'. These were the bigger farmers who collected the high taxes of the smaller farmers. These farmers made a lot of money off of this, but it also put a rift between the aristocracy and everyone else. During the end of the Third Syrian War, the high priest Onias II would not pay the tax to the Ptolemy III Euergetes. It is thought that this shows a turning point in the Jew's support of the Ptolemies. The Fourth and Fifth Syrian Wars marked the end of the Ptolemaic control of Palestine. Both of these wars hurt Palestine more than the previous three. That and the combination of the ineffective rulers Ptolemy IV Philopater and Ptolemy V and the might of the large Seleucid army ended the century-long rule of the Ptolemaic Dynasty over Palestine.

Seleucid rule and the Maccabean Revolt

The Seleucid Rule of the Holy Land began in 198 BCE under Antiochus III. He, like the Ptolemies, let the Jews keep their religion and customs and even went so far as to encourage the rebuilding of the temple and city after they welcomed him so warmly into Jerusalem. However, Antiochus owed the Romans a great deal of money. In order to raise this money, he decided to rob a temple. The people at the temple of Bel in Elam were not pleased, so they killed Antiochus and everyone helping him in 187 BCE. He was succeeded by his son Seleucus IV Philopater. He simply defended the area from Ptolemy V before being murdered by his minister in 175. His brother Antiochus IV Epiphanes took his place. Before he killed the king, the minister Heliodorus had tried to steal the treasures from the temple in Jerusalem. He was informed of this by a rival of the current High Priest Onias III. Heliodorus was not allowed into the temple, but it required Onias to go explain to the king why one of his ministers was denied access somewhere. In his absence, his rivals put up a new high priest. Onias' brother Jason (a Hellenized version of Joshua) took his place. Now with Jason as high priest and Antiochus IV as king, many Jews adopted Hellenistic ways. Some of these ways, as stated in the Book of 1 Maccabees, were the building of a gymnasium, finding ways to hide their circumcision, and just generally not abiding by the holy covenant. This led to the beginning of the Maccabean Revolt.

According to the Book of Maccabees, many Jews were not happy with the way Hellenism had spread into Judea. Some of these Jews were Mattathias and his sons. Mattathias refused to offer sacrifice when the king told him to. He killed a Jew who was going to do so as well as the king's representative. Because of this, Mattathias and his sons had to flee. This marks the true beginning of the Maccabean Revolt. Judas Maccabeus became the leader of the rebels. He proved to be a successful general, defeating an army led by Apollonius. They started to catch the attention of King Antiochus IV in 165, who told his chancellor to put an end to the revolt. The chancellor, Lysias, sent three generals to do just that, but they were all defeated by the Maccabees. Soon after, Lysias went himself but, according to 1 and 2 Maccabees he was defeated. There is evidence to show that it was not that simple and that there was negotiation, but Lysias still left. After the death of Antiochus IV in 164, his son, Antiochus V, gave the Jews religious freedom. Lysias claimed to be his regent. Around this time was the re-dedication of the temple. During the siege of the Acra, one of Judas' brothers, Eleazor, was killed. The Maccabees had to retreat back to Jerusalem, where they should have been beaten badly. However, Lysias had to pull out because of a contradiction of who was to be regent for Antiochus V. Shortly after, both were killed by Demetrius I Soter who became the new king. The new high priest, Alcimus, had come to Jerusalem with the company of an army led by Bacchides. A group of scribes called the Hasideans asked him for his word that he would not harm anyone. He agreed, but killed sixty of them. Around this time Judas was able to make a treaty with the Romans. Soon after this, Judas was killed in Jerusalem fighting Bacchides' army. His brother Jonathan succeeded him. For eight years, Jonathan didn't do much. However, in 153 the Seleucid Empire started to face some problems. Jonathan used this chance to exchange his services of troops for Demetrius so that he could take back Jerusalem. He was appointed high priest by Alexander Balas for the same thing. When conflicts between Egypt and the Seleucids arose, Jonathan occupied the Acra. As conflicts over the throne arose, he completely took control of the Acra. But in 142 he was killed. His brother Simon took his place.

The Hasmonean Dynasty

Simon was nominated for the title of high priest, general, and leader by a "great assembly". He reached out to Rome to have them guarantee that Judea would be an independent land. Antiochus VII wanted the cities of Gadara, Joppa, and the Acra back. He also wanted a very large tribute. Simon only wanted to pay a fraction of that for only two of the cities, so Antiochus sent his general Cendebaeus to attack. The general was killed and the army fled. Simon and two of his sons were killed in a plot to overthrow the Hasmoneans. His last remaining son, John Hyrcanus, was supposed to be killed as well, but he was informed of the plan and rushed to Jerusalem to keep it safe. Hyrcanus had many issues to deal with as the new high priest. Antiochus invaded Judea and besieged Jerusalem in 134 BCE. Due to lack of food, Hyrcanus had to make a deal with Antiochus. He had to pay a large sum of money, tear down the walls of the city, acknowledge Seleucid power over Judea, and help the Seleucids fight against the Parthians. Hyrcanus agreed to this, but the war against the Parthians didn't work and Antiochus died in 128. Hyrcanus was able to take back Judea and keep his power. John Hyrcanus also kept good relations with the Roman and the Egyptians, owing to the large number of Jews living there, and conquered Transjordan, Samaria, and Idumea (also known as Edom). Aristobulus I was the first Hasmonean priest-king. He defied his father's wishes that his mother should take over the government and instead had her and all of his brothers except for one thrown in prison. The one not thrown in prison was later killed on his orders. The most significant thing he did during his one-year-reign was conquer most of Galilee. After his death, he was succeeded by his brother Alexander Jannaeus, who was only concerned with power and conquest. He also married his brother's widow, showing little respect for Jewish law. His first conquest was Ptolemais. The people called to Ptolemy IX for aid, as he was in Cyprus. However, it was his mother, Cleopatra III, who came to help Alexander and not her son. Alexander was not a popular ruler. This caused a civil war in Jerusalem that lasted for six years. After Alexander Jannaeus' death, his widow became ruler, but not high priest. The end of the Hasmonean Dynasty was in 63 when the Romans came at the request of the current priest-king Aristobulus II and his competitor Hyrcanus II. In 63 BCE the Roman general Pompey conquered Jerusalem and the Romans put Hyrcanus II up as high priest, but Judea became a client-kingdom of Rome. The dynasty came to an end in 40 BCE when Herod was crowned king of Judah by the Romans. With their help, Herod had seized Jerusalem by 37.

The Herodian dynasty

In 40–39 BCE, Herod the Great was appointed king of the Jews by the Roman Senate, and in 6 CE the last ethnarch of Judea, a descendant of Herod's, was deposed by Emperor Augustus, his territories combined with Idumea and Samaria and annexed as Iudaea Province under direct Roman administration.

Religion
Although the specific process by which the Israelites came to worship only one God is unknown, it is certain that the transition was a gradual one and was not totally accomplished during the First Temple period. Yet, over time, the number of gods that the Israelites worshipped decreased with time, and figurative images vanished from their shrines. Yahwism, as some scholars name this belief system, is often described as a form of henotheism or monolatry. Over the same time, a rich folk religion continued to be practiced across Israel and Judah. These practices were influenced by the polytheistic beliefs of the surrounding ethnicities, and were denounced by the prophets.

In addition to the Temple in Jerusalem, there was public worship practiced all over Israel and Judah in shrines and sanctuaries, outdoors, and close to city gates. In the 8th and 7th centuries BCE, the kings Hezekiah and Josiah of Judah implemented a number of significant religious reforms that aimed to center worship of the God of Israel in Jerusalem and eliminate foreign customs.

Henotheism
Henotheism is the act of worshipping a single god, without denying the existence of other deities. Many scholars believe that before monotheism in ancient Israel, there came a transitional period; in this transitional period many followers of the Israelite religion worshiped the god Yahweh, but did not deny the existence of other deities accepted throughout the region. Henotheistic worship was not uncommon in the Ancient Near East, many Iron Age nation states worshipped an elevated national god which was nonetheless only part of a wider pantheon; examples include Chemosh in Moab, Qos in Edom, Milkom in Ammon, and Ashur in Assyria.

Canaanite religion syncretized elements from neighboring cultures, largely from Mesopotamian religious traditions. Using Canaanite religion as a base was natural due to the fact that the Canaanite culture inhabited the same region prior to the emergence of Israelite culture. Israelite religion was no exception, as during the transitional period, Yahweh and El were syncretized in the Israelite pantheon. El already occupied a reasonably important place in the Israelite religion. Even the name "Israel" is based on the name El, rather than Yahweh. It was this initial harmonization of Israelite and Canaanite religious thought that lead to Yahweh gradually absorbing several characteristics from Canaanite deities, in turn strengthening his own position as an all-powerful "One." Even still, monotheism in the region of ancient Israel and Judah did not take hold overnight, and during the intermediate stages most people are believed to have remained henotheistic.

During this intermediate period of henotheism many families worshiped different gods. Religion was very much centered around the family, as opposed to the community. The region of Israel and Judah was sparsely populated during the time of Moses. As such many different areas worshiped different gods, due to social isolation. It was not until later on in Israelite history that people started to worship Yahweh alone and fully convert to monotheistic values. That switch occurred with the growth of power and influence of the Israelite kingdom and its rulers. Further details of this are contained in the Iron Age Yahwism section below. Evidence from the Bible suggests that henotheism did exist: "They [the Hebrews] went and served alien gods and paid homage to them, gods of whom they had no experience and whom he [Yahweh] did not allot to them" (Deut. 29.26). Many believe that this quote demonstrates that the early Israelite kingdom followed traditions similar to ancient Mesopotamia, where each major urban center had a supreme god. Each culture embraced their patron god but did not deny the existence of other cultures' patron gods. In Assyria, the patron god was Ashur, and in ancient Israel, it was Yahweh; however, both Israelite and Assyrian cultures recognized each other's deities during this period.Some scholars have used the Bible as evidence to argue that most of the people alive during the events recounted in the Hebrew Bible, including Moses, were most likely henotheists. There are many quotes from the Hebrew  Bible that are used to support this view. One such quote from Jewish tradition is the first commandment which in its entirety reads "I am the LORD your God, who brought you out of the land of Egypt, out of the house of bondage: You shall have no other gods before me." This quote does not deny the existence of other gods; it merely states that Jews should consider Yahweh or God the supreme god, incomparable to other supernatural beings. Some scholars attribute the concept of angels and demons found in Judaism and Christianity to the tradition of henotheism. Instead of completely getting rid of the concept of other supernatural beings, these religions changed former deities into angels and demons. Yahweh became the supreme god governing angels, demons and humans, with angels and demons considered more powerful than the average human. This tradition of believing in multiple forms of supernatural beings is attributed by many to the traditions of ancient Mesopotamia and Canaan and their pantheons of gods. Earlier influences from Mesopotamia and Canaan were important in creating the foundation of Israelite religion consistent with the Kingdoms of ancient Israel and Judah, and have left lasting impacts on some of the biggest and most widespread religions in our world today.

Iron Age Yahwism

The religion of the Israelites of Iron Age I, like the Ancient Canaanite religion from which it evolved and other religions of the ancient Near East, was based on a cult of ancestors and worship of family gods (the "gods of the fathers"). With the emergence of the monarchy at the beginning of Iron Age II the kings promoted their family god, Yahweh, as the god of the kingdom, but beyond the royal court, religion continued to be both polytheistic and family-centered. The major deities were not numerous El, Asherah, and Yahweh, with Baal as a fourth god, and perhaps Shamash (the sun) in the early period. At an early stage El and Yahweh became fused and Asherah did not continue as a separate state cult, although she continued to be popular at a community level until Persian times.

Yahweh, the national god of both Israel and Judah, seems to have originated in Edom and Midian in southern Canaan and may have been brought to Israel by the Kenites and Midianites at an early stage. There is a general consensus among scholars that the first formative event in the emergence of the distinctive religion described in the Bible was triggered by the destruction of Israel by Assyria in c. 722 BCE. Refugees from the northern kingdom fled to Judah, bringing with them laws and a prophetic tradition of Yahweh. This religion was subsequently adopted by the landowners of Judah, who in 640 BCE placed the eight-year-old Josiah on the throne. Judah at this time was a vassal state of Assyria, but Assyrian power collapsed in the 630s, and around 622 Josiah and his supporters launched a bid for independence expressed as loyalty to "Yahweh alone".

Prophecy 

In both Israel and Judah, prophets had taken on significant religious and political significance. It is particularly well-known thanks to the prophetic books ("Nevi'im") of the Hebrew Bible. Nearly all of the prophets mentioned in the biblical texts are men, and although they did not necessarily write the prophetic texts, they are undoubtedly the source of those texts. The books of Amos and Hoshea were written in the first half of the 8th century, the First Isaiah ("Proto-Isaiah") a little later, Jeremiah and Ezekiel during the fall of Judah and the early years of the Babylonian captivity, Daniel during the Exile, the Second Isaiah ("Deutero-Isaiah") between the end of the Exile and the start of the post-exilic period, etc.

Prophecy was widespread in the Ancient Near East, as shown by records from Assyria and Mari. Gods communicated with humans (men or women) in order to convey a message meant both specifically for the king and more broadly for the subjects of the kingdom. In some instances, the king requested that the prophet receive a divine message. The context of this function's performance in the Bible is unclear; prophets can be found alone or in groups, at the royal court or in temples (as is most common in other regions of the Near East).

The prophets featured in the biblical accounts were messengers of Yahweh. In the kingdom of Israel, they competed with Ba'al-related prophets. They serve as diviners, and because of their special relationship with Yahweh, they are also said to possess miraculous powers: the Bible records instances of prophets curing the sick, raising the dead, multiplying bread and oil, and bringing rain after a drought.

The prophets of Yahweh from the time of the monarchy have two main messages for the king: to make sure he only worships Yahweh, and to make sure he looks out for the people, especially the least fortunate (the widow and the orphan). The prophets were sometimes supporters of the king's initiatives and his advisors; at other times, they were fierce opponents. They frequently had harsh criticism for how the populace lived. The prophets undoubtedly had a stronger social role than the temple priests, who are a part of the elite group.

The role of the prophets in shaping Yahwism and Monotheism is not clear. Although it has frequently been argued that the prophets were merely intermediaries for the wishes of the Yahwist elites of the court and the Temple, it is possible that they were instrumental in the development and spread of monotheism.

The Babylonian exile and Second Temple Judaism

According to the Deuteronomists, as scholars call these Judean nationalists, the treaty with Yahweh would enable Israel's god to preserve both the city and the king in return for the people's worship and obedience. The destruction of Jerusalem, its Temple, and the Davidic dynasty by Babylon in 587/586 BCE was deeply traumatic and led to revisions of the national mythos during the Babylonian exile. This revision was expressed in the Deuteronomistic history, the books of Joshua, Judges, Samuel and Kings, which interpreted the Babylonian destruction as divinely-ordained punishment for the failure of Israel's kings to worship Yahweh to the exclusion of all other deities.

The Second Temple period (520 BCE 70 CE) differed in significant ways from what had gone before. Strict monotheism emerged among the priests of the Temple establishment during the seventh and sixth centuries BCE, as did beliefs regarding angels and demons. At this time, circumcision, dietary laws, and Sabbath-observance gained more significance as symbols of Jewish identity, and the institution of the synagogue became increasingly important, and most of the biblical literature, including the Torah, was substantially revised during this time.

Administrative and judicial structure 

As was customary in the ancient Near East, a king ruled over the kingdoms of Israel and Judah. The national god Yahweh, who selects those to rule his realm and his people, is depicted in the Hebrew Bible as having a hand in the establishment of the royal institution. In this sense, the true king is God, and the king serves as his earthly envoy and is tasked with ruling his realm. In some Psalms that appear to be related to the coronation of kings, they are referred to as "sons of Yahweh". The kings actually had to succeed one another according to a dynastic principle, even though the succession was occasionally decided through coups d'état. The coronation seemed to take place in a sacred place, and was marked by the anointing of the king who then becomes the "anointed one (māšîaḥ ,the origin of the word Messiah) of Yahweh"; the end of the ritual seems marked by an acclamation by the people (or at least their representatives, the Elders), followed by a banquet.

The Bible's descriptions of the lists of dignitaries from the reigns of David and Solomon show that the king is supported by a group of high dignitaries. Those include the chief of the army, the great scribe who was in charge of the management of the royal chancellery, the herald, as well as the high priest and the master of the palace, who has a function of stewardship of the household of the king at the beginning and seems to become a real prime minister of Judah during the later periods. The attributions of most of these dignitaries remain debated, as illustrated in particular by the much-discussed case of the “king's friend” mentioned under Solomon.

Language and literature 
A writing system unique to the Israelites emerged from the Phoenician alphabet around the 10th century. This system is today known as the Paleo-Hebrew alphabet. Consonantal in nature, this abjad contains twenty-two letters. The language spoken during this period was Biblical Hebrew, an ancient variant of Hebrew, a Northwest Semitic language related to Phoenician and Aramaic. As evidenced by ancient inscriptions, dialect variations existed, particularly between the northern Kingdom of Israel ("Israelian Hebrew") and the South (Judah). The biblical texts are predominantly written in the Judahite dialect.

See also

References

Citations

Sources

Further reading

 Marc Zvi, "The Creation of History in Ancient Israel" (Routledge, 1995), and also review at Dannyreviews.com
 Cook, Stephen L., "The social roots of biblical Yahwism" (Society of Biblical Literature, 2004)
 Day, John (ed), "In search of pre-exilic Israel: proceedings of the Oxford Old Testament Seminar" (T&T Clark International, 2004)
 Gravett, Sandra L., "An Introduction to the Hebrew Bible: A Thematic Approach" (Westminster John Knox Press, 2008)
 Grisanti, Michael A., and Howard, David M., (eds), "Giving the Sense:Understanding and Using Old Testament Historical Texts" (Kregel Publications, 2003)
 Hess, Richard S., "Israelite religions: an archaeological and biblical survey" Baker, 2007)
 Kavon, Eli, "Did the Maccabees Betray the Hanukka Revolution?", The Jerusalem Post, 26 December 2005
 Lemche, Neils Peter, "The Old Testament between theology and history: a critical survey" (Westminster John Knox Press, 2008)
 Levine, Lee I., "Jerusalem: portrait of the city in the second Temple period (538 B.C.E.–70 C.E.)" (Jewish Publication Society, 2002)
 Na'aman, Nadav, "Ancient Israel and its neighbours" (Eisenbrauns, 2005)
 Penchansky, David, "Twilight of the gods: polytheism in the Hebrew Bible" (Westminster John Knox Press, 2005)
 Provan, Iain William, Long, V. Philips, Longman, Tremper, "A Biblical History of Israel" (Westminster John Knox Press, 2003)
 Stephen C., "Images of Egypt in early biblical literature" (Walter de Gruyter, 2009)
 Sparks, Kenton L., "Ethnicity and identity in ancient Israel" (Eisenbrauns, 1998)
 Stackert, Jeffrey, "Rewriting the Torah: literary revision in Deuteronomy and the holiness code" (Mohr Siebeck, 2007)
 Vanderkam, James, "An introduction to early Judaism" (Eerdmans, 2001)

Ancient Jewish history